Aithe 2.0 is a 2018 Indian Telugu-language techno-thriller directed by Raj Madiraju. The film stars newcomers Bengali-Hindi actor Indraneil Sengupta (in his Telugu debut), Zara Shah, Abhishek, Kartavya Sharma, Neeraj, Mrunal, Mridanjli and Dr. Srikanth. The film was simultaneously shot in Hindi as Pirates 1.0; however, the Hindi version was never theatrically released. The film is a reboot of Aithe (2003).

Cast 
 Indraneil Sengupta as  Avinash Ganguly
 Zara Shah as Esha
 Abhishek Gupta
 Kartavya Sharma
 Neeraj
 Mrunal
 Mridanjli
 Dr. Srikanth

Soundtrack 
Music by Arun Chilveru and songs by Naresh Iyer, Dev Negi and Rituraj.

Release and reception 
The film released on 16 March 2018.

A critic from The Hindu opined that "The interesting premise of ‘Aithe 2.0’ is undone by amateurish execution". A critic from The Times of India gave the film a rating of two-and-a-half out of five stars and stated that "On the whole, Aithe 2.0 is a good attempt by Raj Madiraju that will appeal to niche audiences". A critic from The New Indian Express wrote that "Although the plot was good, the execution falls flat". A critic from 123 Telugu said that "On the whole, Aithe 2.0 is a good concept gone wrong".

References

External links 

2018 films